Alfred Beni (3 June 1923 — 4 June 1995) was an Austrian chess International Master (IM) (1951).

Biography
Alfred Beni was two-time silver medalist Austrian Chess Championship (1947, 1952). In 1957, he represented Austria in the Zonal Chess tournament. Alfred Beni consisted of Vienna chess clubs: Schachklub Sandleiten (until 1941), Schachklub Hietzing Wien (1941-1945 and 1948-1977), Schachklub Ing. Georg Weisel (1945–1948), Schachklub Donaustadt (1977–1995; including as President).

Alfred Beni played for Austria in the Chess Olympiads:
 In 1950, at first board in the 9th Chess Olympiad in Dubrovnik (+5, =9, -1),
 In 1952, at third board in the 10th Chess Olympiad in Helsinki (+5, =4, -4),
 In 1954, at second board in the 11th Chess Olympiad in Amsterdam (+8, =5, -3),
 In 1958, at fourth board in the 13th Chess Olympiad in Munich (+6, =5, -5),
 In 1960, at second board in the 14th Chess Olympiad in Leipzig (+5, =9, -4),
 In 1962, at third board in the 15th Chess Olympiad in Varna (+4, =6, -6),
 In 1964, at second board in the 16th Chess Olympiad in Tel Aviv (+2, =8, -5).

Alfred Beni played for Austria in the European Team Chess Championship preliminaries:
 In 1957, at third board in the 1st European Team Chess Championship preliminaries (+0, =2, -2),
 In 1961, at second board in the 2nd European Team Chess Championship preliminaries (+0, =1, -4),
 In 1965, at first board in the 3rd European Team Chess Championship preliminaries (+1, =1, -2).

Also Alfred Beni five time participated in Clare Benedict Chess Cup (1953, 1959-1960, 1963-1964) and in team competition won two bronze (1959, 1964) medals.

References

External links

Alfred Beni chess games at 365chess.com

1923 births
1995 deaths
Austrian chess players
Chess International Masters
Chess Olympiad competitors
20th-century chess players